Daniel Despotovic (born December 9, 1989) is a Swedish professional ice hockey player who currently plays for Hammarby Hockey.

References

External links

1989 births
Living people
Swedish ice hockey forwards
Rapaces de Gap players
Södertälje SK players
Storhamar Dragons players
People from Södertälje
Sportspeople from Stockholm County